Lomatogoniopsis is a genus of flowering plants belonging to the family Gentianaceae.

Its native range is Eastern Himalaya to Western and Southern Central China.

Species:

Lomatogoniopsis alpina 
Lomatogoniopsis galeiformis 
Lomatogoniopsis ovatifolia

References

Gentianaceae
Gentianaceae genera